Martin Zielonka (February 15, 1877 – January 1, 1938) was a German-born Jewish-American rabbi.

Early life and education 
Zielonka was born on February 15, 1877, in Berlin, Germany, the son of David Zielonka and Bertha Sanger. Zielonka came to America with his parents when he was three and attended school in Cincinnati, Ohio. He graduated from the University of Cincinnati with an A.B. in 1899. He also finished an eight year course and graduated from Hebrew Union College that year, and his class there was the last to be ordained rabbis by Isaac Mayer Wise.

Career 
He served as rabbi of Congregation Rodef Sholom of Waco, Texas, from 1899 to 1900. He then became rabbi of Temple Mount Sinai in El Paso in 1900, serving as rabbi there until his death in 1938. He helped organize the El Paso Health League in 1905, the Memorial Park in 1920, and the College of the City of El Paso in 1915. He served as a director of the latter until 1920. In 1921, he organized and became chairman of B'nai B'rith work in Mexico. From 1922 to 1927, he was a chairman, with the rank of major, of the United States Officers Reserve Corps. He was also an executive committee member of the Central Conference of American Rabbis, and served as president of the Hebrew Union College Alumni Association from 1929 to 1931. 

Zielonka founded the Junior College, which later merged with the School of Mines, as well as the Associated Charities. He served a term as president of the B'nai B'rith Seventh District. In 1927, he was elected rabbi for life at Temple Mount Sinai. He researched the history of Mexican Jewry, published his research in the Publications of the American Jewish Historical Society, read a paper on the economic, cultural, and religious life of Mexican Jews before the Central Conference of American Rabbis in 1927, and possessed a library of Mexicana and histories of South American Inquisition his heirs donated to the American Jewish Historical Society upon his death.

Board memberships 
Zielonka was a member of the Central Conference of American Rabbis, the American Jewish Historical Society, the Jewish Research Society, the Freemasons, and the Rotary Club.

Personal life 
In 1901, he married Dora Schatzky. Their son was Rabbi David Leopold, who served as rabbi of Temple Beth El of Corsicana, Texas, and of Congregation Schaarai Zedek in Tampa, Florida. Zielonka gave the baccalaureate sermon when David was ordained at Hebrew Union College in 1929.

Death 
Zielonka died in Providence Hospital on January 1, 1938. A large crowd of different religions and races attended his funeral at Temple Mount Sinai, including Bishop of El Paso Anthony Joseph Schuler. Rabbi Edgar Magnin of Los Angeles prayed at the funeral and assistant rector of St. Clement's Episcopal Church Rev. B. M. G. Williams delivered the eulogy. 83 cars followed the hearse with Zielonka's body to Mt. Sinai Cemetery, where he was buried. An additional 19 cars were already at the cemetery, making a total of nearly 400 people who attended the burial.

References 

1877 births
1938 deaths
Rabbis from Berlin
19th-century German Jews
American people of German-Jewish descent
German emigrants to the United States
19th-century American rabbis
20th-century American rabbis
American Reform rabbis
Rabbis from Texas
Rabbis from Cincinnati
People from Waco, Texas
People from El Paso, Texas
American Freemasons
Burials in Texas